Changbu may refer to these towns in China:

Changbu, Guangdong (长布), in Wuhua County, Guangdong
Changbu, Jiangxi (长埠), in Anyi County, Jiangxi